Electronic Workshops in Computing (eWiC) is a publication series by the British Computer Society.

The series provides free online access for conferences and workshops in the area of computing. For example, the EVA London Conference proceedings on Electronic Visualisation and the Arts has appeared in the series since 2008, indexed by DBLP. Physical proceedings are also provided for conferences and workshops as well if required.

A conference archive is freely available online from 1995.

See also
 Lecture Notes in Computer Science

References

External links
 eWiC website

1995 establishments in the United Kingdom
Publications established in 1995
Computer science books
Series of non-fiction books
Conference proceedings published in books
British Computer Society